Lobstick Lake became part of the Smallwood Reservoir, along with Michikamau Lake, upon the damming of the Churchill River in western Labrador, Newfoundland and Labrador, Canada. It forms the western section of the Smallwood Reservoir and lies just north of Ossokmanuan Lake.

Fishing
The Lobstick Lake has a large population of lake trout. Fishermen and anglers frequently catch fish weighing five pounds, with some captured specimens being over 40 pounds. The fishing season on the lake lasts throughout the year, but the best season for fishing are late spring and early summer. Fishing aficionados recommend the section of the lake near the dam as the best spot.

References

Labrador
Lakes of Newfoundland and Labrador